Mekongia is a genus of Viviparidae, a gastropoda mollusca in the subfamily Bellamyinae  of the family Viviparidae. 

The name of this genus comes from the Mekongia river of Indochina peninsula.

Species 
, WoRMS recorded the following species under Mekongia:
 Mekongia crassa (Benson, 1836)
 Mekongia franzhuberi Thach, 2021
 Mekongia jullieni (Deshayes, 1876)
 Mekongia lamarcki (Deshayes, 1876)
 Mekongia liuiana (Yen, 1937)
 Mekongia pongensis Brandt, 1968
 Mekongia rattei (Crosse & P. Fischer, 1876)
 Mekongia siamensis (Frauenfeld, 1865)
 Mekongia smithi (Yen, 1942)
 Mekongia sphaericula (Deshayes, 1876)
 Mekongia swainsoniana (I. Lea, 1856)

 taxon inquirendum
 Mekongia bocourti (Mabille, 1889)
 Mekangia rivularia: possibly the synonym of Rivularia bicarinata, according to comment of referenced text.
 Mekongia turbinata (Deshayes, 1876)

synonyms
 Mekongia eyriesi (Morelet, 1865): synonym of Eyriesia eyriesi (Morelet, 1865) (superseded combination)
 Mekangia hunanensis Yen, 1942, named after the Hunan privince of China, is now: synonym of Mekongia liuiana (Yen, 1937), a species of the same genus discovered by the same author earlier;
 Mekongia moreleti (Deshayes, 1876): synonym of Mekongia siamensis (Frauenfeld, 1865) (a junior synonym)
 Mekongia swainsoni (I. Lea, 1856): synonym of Mekongia swainsoniana (I. Lea, 1856) (incorrect subsequent spelling)
 Mekongia yunnanensis: named after the Yunnan province of China.

References 

 Brandt, R. A. M. (1974). The non-marine aquatic Mollusca of Thailand. Archiv für Molluskenkunde. 105: i-iv, 1-423
Seashells*Freshwater*Land snails. With 116 new species and subspecies and rejected synonyms, accepted species, p. 202 pp

External links 
 Crosse, H. & Fischer, P. (1876). Mollusques fluviatiles recueillis au Cambodge par la mission scientifique française de 1873. Journal de Conchyliologie. 24 (4): 313-334.
 

Viviparidae